The Republic Football Championship was a national football competition in Bulgaria, successor of the State Championship. It was organised for only four years between 1945 and 1948. After 1948 it was reorganised as a Republic Football Group.

Format 
The championship was a knockout tournament featuring clubs that had finished at the top of six regional divisions. These divisions were round-robin tournaments that included football clubs from different geographic areas.

Notes:
Bold indicates Double winners – i.e. League and Bulgarian Cup winners.

Performances

Performances by club

Notes: 
Italics indicates clubs no longer exist.

Performances by city

See also
Bulgarian State Football Championship (Champions 1924–1944)
Bulgarian A Football Group (Champions 1948–present)

References

 
Republic Football Championship
Bul
National championships in Bulgaria